The 25th Online Film Critics Society Awards, honoring the best in film for 2021, were announced on January 24, 2022. The nominations were announced on January 18, 2022.

Dune and The Power of the Dog led the nominations with nine each, followed by West Side Story with eight. The Power of the Dog also made a clean sweep, winning all nine of its nominations, including Best Picture.

Winners and nominees

{| class="wikitable"
|-
! style="background:#EEDD82; width: 50%"| Best Picture
! style="background:#EEDD82; width: 50%"| Best Director
|-
| valign="top" |
 The Power of the Dog
  Drive My Car
 Licorice Pizza
 Dune
 The Green Knight
 Pig
 The Worst Person in the World
 Titane
 West Side Story
 Belfast
| valign="top" |
 Jane Campion – The Power of the Dog
 Paul Thomas Anderson – Licorice Pizza
 Ryusuke Hamaguchi – Drive My Car
 Steven Spielberg – West Side Story
 Denis Villeneuve – Dune
|-
! style="background:#EEDD82; width: 50%"| Best Actor
! style="background:#EEDD82; width: 50%"| Best Actress
|-
| valign="top" |
 Benedict Cumberbatch – The Power of the Dog as Phil Burbank
 Nicolas Cage – Pig as Robbie "Rob" Feld
 Andrew Garfield – tick, tick... BOOM! as Jonathan Larson
 Oscar Isaac – The Card Counter as William Tell
 Hidetoshi Nishijima – Drive My Car as Yūsuke Kafuku
| valign="top" |
 Olivia Colman – The Lost Daughter as Leda Caruso
 Alana Haim – Licorice Pizza as Alana Kane
 Renate Reinsve – The Worst Person in the World as Julie
 Agathe Rousselle – Titane as Alexia / Adrien
 Kristen Stewart – Spencer as Diana, Princess of Wales
|-
! style="background:#EEDD82; width: 50%"| Best Supporting Actor
! style="background:#EEDD82; width: 50%"| Best Supporting Actress
|-
| valign="top" |
 Kodi Smit-McPhee – The Power of the Dog as Peter Gordon
 Mike Faist – West Side Story as Riff
 Ciarán Hinds – Belfast as Pop
 Troy Kotsur – CODA as Frank Rossi
 Jeffrey Wright – The French Dispatch as Roebuck Wright
| valign="top" |
 Kirsten Dunst – The Power of the Dog as Rose Gordon
 Ariana DeBose – West Side Story as Anita
 Ann Dowd – Mass as Linda
 Aunjanue Ellis – King Richard as Oracene "Brandy" Price
 Ruth Negga – Passing as Clare Bellew
|-
! style="background:#EEDD82; width: 50%"| Best Animated Feature
! style="background:#EEDD82; width: 50%"| Best Film Not in the English Language
|-
| valign="top" |
 The Mitchells vs. the Machines
 Encanto
 Flee
 Luca
 Raya and the Last Dragon
| valign="top" |
 Drive My Car (Japan)
 Flee (Denmark)
 A Hero (Iran)
 Titane (France)
 The Worst Person in the World (Norway)
|-
! style="background:#EEDD82; width: 50%"| Best Documentary
! style="background:#EEDD82; width: 50%"| Best Debut Feature
|-
| valign="top" |
 Summer of Soul (...Or, When the Revolution Could Not Be Televised)
 Flee
 Procession
 The Rescue
 The Velvet Underground
| valign="top" |
 Maggie Gyllenhaal – The Lost Daughter
 Rebecca Hall – Passing
 Fran Kranz – Mass
 Michael Sarnoski – Pig
 Emma Seligman – Shiva Baby
|-
! style="background:#EEDD82; width: 50%"| Best Original Screenplay
! style="background:#EEDD82; width: 50%"| Best Adapted Screenplay
|-
| valign="top" |
 Michael Sarnoski and Vanessa Block – Pig
 Paul Thomas Anderson – Licorice Pizza
 Kenneth Branagh – Belfast
 Asghar Farhadi – A Hero
 Fran Kranz – Mass
| valign="top" |
 Jane Campion – The Power of the Dog
 Maggie Gyllenhaal – The Lost Daughter
 Rebecca Hall – Passing
 Ryusuke Hamaguchi and Takamasa Oe – Drive My Car
 Eric Roth, Jon Spaihts, and Denis Villeneuve – Dune
|-
! style="background:#EEDD82; width: 50%"| Best Cinematography
! style="background:#EEDD82; width: 50%"| Best Editing
|-
| valign="top" |
 Ari Wegner – The Power of the Dog
 Bruno Delbonnel – The Tragedy of Macbeth
 Greig Fraser – Dune
 Janusz Kamiński – West Side Story
 Andrew Droz Palermo – The Green Knight
| valign="top" |
 Peter Sciberras – The Power of the Dog
 Úna Ní Dhonghaíle – Belfast
 Andy Jurgensen – Licorice Pizza
 Michael Kahn and Sarah Broshar – West Side Story
 Joe Walker – Dune
|-
! style="background:#EEDD82; width: 50%"| Best Costume Design
! style="background:#EEDD82; width: 50%"| Best Production Design
|-
| valign="top" |
 Dune
 Cruella
 The French Dispatch
 Spencer
 West Side Story
| valign="top" |
 The French Dispatch
 Dune
 The Green Knight
 Nightmare Alley
 West Side Story
|-
! style="background:#EEDD82; width: 50%"| Best Original Score
! style="background:#EEDD82; width: 50%"| Best Visual Effects
|-
| valign="top" |
 Jonny Greenwood – The Power of the Dog
 Alexandre Desplat – The French Dispatch
 Germaine Franco – Encanto
 Jonny Greenwood – Spencer
 Hans Zimmer – Dune
| valign="top" |
 Dune
 The Green Knight
 The Matrix Resurrections
 Shang-Chi and the Legend of the Ten Rings
 Spider-Man: No Way Home
|}

Special awards

Technical Achievement Awards
 Dune – Sound Design
 In the Heights – Choreography
 Memoria – Sound Design
 No Time to Die – Stunt Coordination
 West Side Story – Choreography

Lifetime Achievement Awards
 John Carpenter
 Tony Leung Chiu-wai
 Sheila Nevins
 Paul Schrader
 John Williams

Special Achievement Awards
 Turner Classic Movies (TCM), for providing worldwide access to classic films, including silent films
 IATSE Workers, for bringing attention to labor issues in the film industry and fighting for better standards
 The Association of Moving Image Archivists (AMIA), an important non-profit organization devoted to the preservation of film

Non-U.S. Releases
 1970 (Poland)
 Bank Job (United Kingdom)
 Benediction (United Kingdom)
 The Girl and the Spider (Switzerland)
 The Medium (Thailand)
 Ninjababy (Norway)
 Petite Maman (France)
 Pleasure (Sweden)
 The Tsugua Diaries (Portugal)
 Vengeance Is Mine, All Others Pay Cash (Indonesia)

Films with multiple nominations and awards

References

External links
 
 2021 AWARDS (25TH ANNUAL) at ofcs.org

2021 film awards
2021